Mikko Siivikko (born 8 June 1986) is a Finnish professional football goalkeeper who currently plays for AC Oulu in Oulu in Finland.

References

1986 births
Living people
Finnish footballers
Association football goalkeepers